Knut Erik Tranøy (10 December 191819 March 2012) was a Norwegian philosopher.

During World War II Tranøy, along with 700 other Norwegian students, was deported to the Buchenwald concentration camp in Germany. He was appointed professor at the University of Bergen from 1959, and at the University of Oslo from 1978. His main contributions have been in fields of ethics, particularly in medicine and science. He is a member of the Norwegian Academy of Science and Letters from 1979. He was decorated as Knight, First Class of the Royal Norwegian Order of St. Olav in 2002.

He resided at Fossum terrasse.

Selected works
Tysklandsstudentene (1946) (co-authored with Michael Sars)
On the Logic of Normative Systems (1953, thesis)
 
The Moral Import of Science. Essays on Normative Theory, Scientific Activity and Wittgenstein (1998)

References

1918 births
2012 deaths
Buchenwald concentration camp survivors
Academic staff of the University of Bergen
Academic staff of the University of Oslo
Members of the Norwegian Academy of Science and Letters
20th-century Norwegian philosophers
Norwegian ethicists